Liz Grogan is a Canadian television host.

She co-hosted CBWT's Noon Hour program in the 1970s.

Later she moved to CTV on the program Live It Up!, one of the first co-hosts in the program.

She was co-host with Peter Feniak of CTV's Lifetime between 1986 and 1988, but had to leave the show because she was pregnant.

In the mid-1990s she co-hosted a health phone-in program with Dr. Rosana Pellizzari on WTN, Doctor on Call. She hosted Globetrotter, a travel program for women, on WTN for the 1996–97 season.

On September 12, 1987 she married freelance cinematographer Doug McLellan.

References

External links
 

Canadian television hosts
Canadian women television hosts
Living people
Year of birth missing (living people)